The Don-class submarine tender was the NATO reporting name for a group of seven submarine tenders built for the Soviet Navy in the late 1950s. The Soviet designation was Project 310 Batur. Evolving from a need for dispersed basing of submarines in the advent of a nuclear war, the ships were designed to support distant operations of the Soviet Union's submarine fleet, capable of repairing and resupplying. However, the Soviets returned to stationary basing of their submarines and the Don class were later converted into flagships. One vessel was exported to Indonesia in 1962 and due to the ship's heavy armament, was used primarily for patrol duties. The ships of the Don class were removed from service in the mid 1990s and broken up for scrap.

Design
With the advent of nuclear war and the danger that stationary bases faced, the Soviet Navy sought to disperse the fleet while still maintaining functionality. As a result, the Soviet Central Design Bureau came up with  meaning "Floating Base" in the mid 1950s to serve as distant logistic support for submarines. Designated Project 310 Batur by the Soviets and the NATO reporting name Don class, their chief designer was V. I. Mogilevich. Each ship was capable of providing emergency repairs to submarine hulls, and resupplying and rearming up  to four submarines of projects 611 and 613 each. Each ship of the class had storage space for 42  torpedoes.

The sources disagree on the dimensions and displacement of the ships.

The Don-class tenders were powered by diesel-electric system comprising four diesel engines and two electric motors turning two propeller shafts creating . The tenders had an endurance of 40 days at sea. The ships had a complement of 350 including 28 officers and additional crew space for up to 394 headquarters/submarine personnel. To resupply the submarines, the vessels had a single 100-ton crane fitted at the bow, one 10-ton crane, two 5-ton cranes and two 1-ton cranes.

The submarine tenders had varying armament throughout their careers and between ships. The majority were armed with four single-mounted B-34USMA /56 dual-purpose guns and four twin-mounted ZIF 31B /70 anti-air (AA) guns. Viktor Kotelnikov was armed with only two 100 mm guns and Magadansky Komsomolets had none. Kamchatsky Komsomolets and Fyodor Vidyaev both ported four twin /80 AA guns. Those with guns removed had instead a helicopter landing pad over the stern. On the final ship of the class, an OSA-M AA missile system was installed.

Those Don-class ships equipped with the 100 mm guns were given two Hawk Screech fire control radars operating on the I band. For surface search, they had Slim Net radar operating on the E/F bands, though some were equipped with Strut Curve operating only on the F band. For identification of friend or foe, they had Square Head and High Pole A systems installed. For electronic support measures, the tenders had two Watch Dog systems mounted.

Construction and career

Seven ships were built for the Soviet Navy with one ship (Nikolay Kartashov) exported to Indonesia in 1962. Those ships that were named, were named for military personnel killed in World War II. All seven ships were constructed at the Ivan Nosenko #444 Black Sea Shipyard in Nikolayev, Soviet Union. Following the expansion of stationary naval bases by the Soviet Navy, some of the vessels were converted to flagships. Fyodor Vidyaev and Dmitriy Galkin were given Vee Cone antenna for long range communications.

Ships in class

Export
Beginning in 1958, Indonesia began a closer relationship with the Eastern Bloc during the Cold War. A result of this closer relationship saw the transfer of nearly 100 naval vessels from the Soviet Union. Among the ships transferred was a Don-class submarine tender, the ex Nikolay Kartashov in 1962, arriving in Indonesia in July of that year and 14 Project 613 submarines. Renamed KRI Ratulangi, the vessel had the same specifications as the other Don-class tenders and was armed with 100 mm, 57 mm and 25 guns. The ship was equipped with different sensors, carrying Slim Net radar for air/surface search operating on the E/F bands and RCA SPN 11 (CR-103) for surface search operating on the I/J bands and for fire control, Sun Visor B radar operating on the  G/H and I bands. 

Ratulangi was used as a submarine support ship and escort vessel. Due to ship's heavy armament, the tender was used as a patrol vessel. Ratulangi was discarded in 1990, the same year the last Project 613 submarine was discarded by the Indonesian Navy.

See also
 List of ships of the Soviet Navy
 List of ships of Russia by project number

Notes

Citations

References

External links

 Page in English
 All Don class submarine tenders – Complete Ship List

 
Auxiliary depot ship classes
Auxiliary ships of the Soviet Navy